The Sikh Light Infantry is a light infantry regiment of the Indian Army. The regiment is the successor unit to the 23rd, 32nd and 34th Royal Sikh Pioneers of the British Indian Army. The regiment recruits from the Sikh community of Himachal Pradesh, Punjab and Haryana states of India.
The versatility of the Sikh Light Infantry has seen the regiment conduct operations from conventional warfare on the Siachen Glacier, the highest battlefield in the world, to counter-terrorism. Units of the regiment have also been deployed as part of the United Nations Emergency Force. The regimental motto is "Deg Tegh Fateh", meaning "prosperity in peace and victory in war". The motto has great significance with the tenth Sikh guru, Guru Gobind Singh, with whom the Mazhabi community is very closely associated, Guru Gobind Singh named them mazhabhi as in faithful for their dedication to do good. The regiment's cap badge is a chakram or quoit, with a mounted kirpan. The insignia was designed to honour the Mazhabi community's Akali Nihang ancestry.

History

The Sikh Light Infantry's predecessors, the 23rd, 32nd and 34th Royal Sikh Pioneers of the British Indian Army, could all trace their origins to 1857. The 23rd Sikh Pioneers were raised as 15th (Pioneer) Regiment of Punjab Infantry and although they were pioneers by name, they functioned as a regular infantry regiment specially trained as assault pioneers. They served during the Second Opium War, the expedition to Abyssinia, the Second Anglo-Afghan War, the expedition to Tibet, and the First World War. The 32nd Sikh Pioneers and the 34th Royal Sikh Pioneers were raised as Punjab Sappers in 1857. They fought in the Indian Rebellion of 1857, the Second Anglo-Afghan War and the First World War. In 1922, the army was reformed from single battalion regiments to multi-battalion regiments, and the 23rd, 32nd and 34th Sikh Pioneers were amalgamated into the 3rd Sikh Pioneers. They were renamed in 1929 to the Corps of Sikh Pioneers, which was disbanded in 1933. It was then re-raised during the Second World War as the Mazhabi and Ramdasia Sikh Light Infantry, with the first battalion being raised on 1 October 1941. Recruitment was then opened up to Ramdasia Sikhs. The regiment inherited the battle honours, colours and traditions of the Corps of Sikh Pioneers. The regiment's name was changed again in 1944 to the Sikh Light Infantry.

Post-independence
After Indian independence, the Sikh Light Infantry was allotted to the newly formed Indian Army.

Independence of Goa from Portuguese occupation
During the 1961 annexation of Goa, the 2nd & 4th battalions, Sikh Light Infantry augmented the strength of the 50th Parachute Brigade. The battalion supported the main thrust of the attack as part of its western column. They moved rapidly across minefields, roadblocks and four riverine obstacles to be the first to reach Panaji.

Operation Pawan
The 13th battalion, Sikh Light Infantry was deployed during Operation Pawan in Sri Lanka as part of the Indian Peace Keeping Force in 1987. Troops from 13 Sikh LI were involved in the Jaffna University Helidrop, an operation that aimed to capture the LTTE leadership at their tactical headquarters in Jaffna University. The operation ended disastrously due to intelligence and planning failures. Delta Company, 13 Sikh LI, led by Maj. Birendra Singh, was the first company to be heli-dropped in. However, LTTE militants had intercepted Indian radio communications prior to the operation and had laid an ambush, hitting the helicopters with RPGs and .50 calibre machine gun rounds. Heavy damage to the helicopters meant that further drops were impossible and as a result, only 30 of the intended 360 Sikh LI troops made it to the university, including Maj. Birendra Singh and one of the platoon commanders, Sub. Samparan Singh. Completely surrounded, outnumbered, outgunned and with no support, the 30 troops from D Coy were progressively annihilated throughout the night. Maj Birendra Singh and Sub. Samparan Singh were killed sometime in the morning, and by 11:30 am there were only 3 troops left. When they ran out of ammunition, they fixed bayonets and charged. 2 of them were killed by LTTE fire and the third, Sep. Gora Singh, was taken prisoner. In total, 29 out of the 30 troops from D Coy who landed were killed.

40 Sikh soldiers were left and fought for 4 days without food and water and they had run out of ammunition. They said the Ardas and charged at the LTTE soldiers with their batons and died.

When reinforcements reached the university after a week of heavy fighting, they found the battlefield littered with pieces of Sikh LI uniforms and equipment, along with thousands of .50 BMG shells. According to Sep. Gora Singh, the dead Sikhs were stripped of their weapons, uniforms and equipment and their bare bodies were laid out in a row at the nearby Buddhist Nagaraja Vihar temple. The corpses were then burnt with a barrel of oil. The LTTE claimed to have tried to get in touch with the IPKF HQ at Palali, but apparently their efforts to get them collect the dead bodies were in vain. The bodies had started to decompose, and they had no option but to cremate them.

Units

1st Battalion
2nd Battalion
3rd Battalion
4th Battalion
5th Battalion
6th Battalion
7th Battalion
8th Battalion
9th Battalion
10th Battalion
11th Battalion
12th Battalion
13th Battalion
14th Battalion
15th Battalion
16th Battalion
17th Battalion
18th Battalion
19th Battalion
103rd Infantry Battalion Territorial Army (Sikh LI) : Ludhiana , Punjab 
158th Infantry Battalion Territorial Army (Sikh LI) : Janglot , Jammu & Kashmir 
163rd Infantry Battalion Territorial Army (Sikh LI) : Hyderbeigh , Jammu & Kashmir 

The 9th battalion has a specialist role, as it conducts special amphibious assaults similar in nature to the Royal Marines of the United Kingdom.

Culture
 The chakram and kirpan are traditional and iconic weapons of the Akali Nihang order, a religious warrior monk order started by Guru Gobind Singh in the 18th century. The Mazhabi Sikhs dominated this order throughout the 18th and 19th centuries. The chakram and kirpan were thus combined to make the Sikh Light Infantry cap badge.

Due to the cultural origin of its recruits, the regiment maintains not only a strong Sikh culture but a strong Punjabi culture. Bhangra, a popular folk dance of the Punjab, is a regular pastime of the soldiers. Sikhism plays a strong role in the day-to-day life and functioning of the regiment and its soldiers some of which have Chakrams on their turbans. The regiment maintains its own regimental gurdwara for the daily worship for its soldiers. The religious life of the soldiers sees them conduct shabad kirtan and all other aspects of Sikh worship. The teachings of Guru Gobind Singh and the notion of sant-sipahi ("saint-soldier") play a large role in regimental life. Historically, the Mazhabi Sikhs have long served in the armies of Guru Gobind Singh and in the later Khalsa Army raised by Ranjit Singh, which forged and established the Sikh Empire. Most times before entering battle Sikh soldiers said the Ardas and then went into battle. Before the Regiment was formed it was called the Rattray's Sikhs, who notably did not tie their beards and carried 3 foot long swords into battle. 

The regimental motto, Deg Tegh Fateh ("prosperity in peace and victory in war") is also derived from Guru Gobind Singh. It incorporates his teachings of peace, tolerance and community spirit, but also the duty to unsheathe the sword when a tyrant or oppressor threatens that ethos and refuses peaceful co-existence. The battle cry of the regiment is "Jo Bole So Nihal, Sat Sri Akal!" meaning "He who recites the name of the lord, shall forever be victorious!"

Recruitment

The Sikh Light Infantry is a "single caste" regiment. Its soldiers are recruited only from Mazhabi or Ramdasia Sikhs. Mazhabi Sikhs must provide identification certificates showing their status as Mazhabi Sikhs for eligibility to join the regiment as well as meeting the other minimum standards. Like all Indian Army regiments, officers can come from all regions and communities in India.

Awards and decorations
 1 Ashoka Chakra
 15 Maha Vir Chakra
 16 Kirti Chakra
 23 Vir Chakra
 28 Shaurya Chakra
 182 Sena Medal
 14 Param Vishisht Seva Medals
 28 Ati Vishisht Seva Medals
 13 Yudh Seva Medals
 17 Vishisht Seva Medals
 109 Mention-in-Despatches
 322 COAS's Commendation Cards

Maha Vir Chakra
 Brigadeer Babaji Sant Singh

References

External links
Sikh Light Infantry DefenseIndia.com
Sikhs in British Armed Forces: Gateway to Sikhism AllAboutSikhs.com
The Sikh Light Infantry Regiments.org
The Sikh Light Infantry Bharat-Rakshak.com
History of the Sikh Pioneers - Lt-Gen Sir George MacMunn

British Indian Army infantry regiments
Infantry regiments of the Indian Army from 1947
Sikh warriors
Units of the Indian Peace Keeping Force